Piero Carletto (6 March 1963 – 14 May 2022) was an Italian rower. He competed in the men's eight event at the 1988 Summer Olympics.

References

External links
 

1963 births
2022 deaths
Italian male rowers
Olympic rowers of Italy
Rowers at the 1988 Summer Olympics
Sportspeople from Padua